Calton Pu from the Georgia Institute of Technology, Atlanta, GA was named Fellow of the Institute of Electrical and Electronics Engineers (IEEE) in 2016 for contributions to system software specialization, information security, and services computing.

References

Fellow Members of the IEEE
Living people
Year of birth missing (living people)
Georgia Tech faculty
American electrical engineers